Baghlia is a commune in Boumerdès Province within Algeria.

It may also refer to: 

 Baghlia District, a district in Boumerdès Province within Algeria.
 August 2010 Baghlia bombing, a terrorist attack in Algeria.
 2012 Baghlia bombing, a terrorist attack in Algeria.